was a Japanese actor born in Ōta, Tokyo, Japan. He was a graduate of the Tokyo metropolitan Yukigaya high school, Mumeijuku and was represented by JVC Entertainment Networks at the time of his death.

Filmography

Television
 Rinrin to (1990, NHK)
 Nurse Station (1991, TBS)
 Yanagi-bashi Ryojō (2000, NHK)
 Onsen e Yukō! (Series, TBS) – A manager
 Deka Kizoku (After Part 2, NTV)
 Jungle
 Aibō (Season IV, EX)
 Byōin e Yukō! (Series TBS) – Yūji Katase
 Wednesday Mystery 9 "A medical examiner Shinomiya Hadzuki" 6 (2005, TX) – Kōichi Machida
 anego (2005 NTV)
 Voice recorder (2005 TBS)
 Ultraman Mebius (2006 CBC/TBS) – Captain Shingo Sakomizu

Film
 Uruu no Machi (1991)
 Gekkō no Natsu (1993) – Shinsuke Kazama
 Uso (1995)
 Miyazawa Kenji -Sono Ai- (1996)
 Kanzō Sensei (1998)
 I love You (1999) – Ryūichi Mizukoshi
 Declaration of war (2000) – Takayasu Tsutsumi
 Godzilla Against Mechagodzilla (2002) – A guard
 Kusa no Ran (2004)
 Deguchi no nai Umi (2006) – Toda
 Ultraman Mebius & Ultraman Brothers (2006) – Captain Shingo Sakomizu
 Kamen Rider W Returns: Kamen Rider Accel (2011) – Police Officer Hiroshi Sagami / Commander Dopant

Stage
 Taiyō to Tsuki ni Somuite (1999)
 Kenkyaku Shōbai (2001, 2003)
 Proof (2001)
 Kotoba (2002)

Dubbing
 Ally McBeal – Raymond Millbury (Josh Hopkins)
 Enemy at the Gates (2003 NTV edition) – Commissar Danilov (Joseph Fiennes)
 Hornblower – Horatio Hornblower (Ioan Gruffudd)
 Starship Troopers – Johnny Rico (Casper Van Dien)
 Summer Scent – Yoo Min-woo (Song Seung-heon)
 Sunshine – Robert Capa (Cillian Murphy)

Television CM
 Kao "Bath Magicrin"
 Kao "Econa Brand"
 Chugai Pharmaceutical "Guronsan"

References

External links 
 JVC Entertainment Networks Official Web Site (Japanese)

1966 births
People from Ōta, Tokyo
2011 suicides
20th-century Japanese male actors
Japanese male television actors
Japanese male stage actors
Japanese male film actors
21st-century Japanese male actors
Male actors from Tokyo
Asadora lead actors
Suicides by hanging in Japan
2011 deaths